Nizhnegaleyevo (Tübänge Ğäle) is a rural locality (a village) in Verkhnegaleyevsky Selsoviet, Zilairsky District, Bashkortostan, Russia. The population was 2 as of 2010. There is 1 street.

Geography 
Nizhnegaleyevo is located 73 km east of Zilair (the district's administrative centre) by road. Verkhnegaleyevo is the nearest rural locality.

References 

Rural localities in Zilairsky District